Jane Mary Gardam  (born 11 July 1928) is an English writer of children's and adult fiction. She also writes reviews for The Spectator and The Telegraph, and writes for BBC radio. She lives in Kent, Wimbledon, and Yorkshire. She has won numerous literary awards, including the Whitbread Award twice. She was appointed Officer of the Order of the British Empire (OBE) in the 2009 New Year Honours.

Biography
Gardam was born in Coatham, North Yorkshire, to William and Kathleen Mary Pearson, and grew up in Cumberland and the North Riding of Yorkshire. Whilst at school she was inspired by a mobile all-woman theatre run by Nancy Hewins who created "She Stoops to Conquer". At the age of seventeen, she won a scholarship to read English at Bedford College, London, now part of Royal Holloway, University of London (BA English, 1949).
After leaving university, Gardam worked in a number of literary-related jobs, starting off as a Red Cross Travelling Librarian for hospital libraries, and later a journalist. She married David Gardam QC and they had three children, Tim, Catharine (Kitty) Nicholson, a botanical artist who died in 2011, and Tom.

Gardam's first book was a children's novel, A Long Way From Verona, a 13-year-old girl's first-person narrative, it was published in 1971.  It won the Phoenix Award from the Children's Literature Association in 1991, which recognizes the best children's book published twenty years earlier that did not win a major award. In 1989, Gardam was on the judging panel of the (then) Whitbread Book Award, now known as the Costa Book Awards.

In her most recent works of fiction she has explored related themes and recounted stories from different points of view in three novels: Old Filth (2004), The Man in the Wooden Hat (2009), and Last Friends (2013). One American reviewer noted that her concern with "the intricate web of manners and class peculiar to the inhabitants of her homeland" does not explain why she remains less well known to an international audience than her English contemporaries. He recommended Old Filth for its "typical excellence and compulsive readability", written by a novelist "at the top of her form". The Spectator praised The Man in the Wooden Hat for its "rich complexities of chronology, settings and characters, all manipulated with marvellous dexterity". In 2015, a BBC survey voted Old Filth among the 100 greatest British novels.

Works and recognition

Children's books
A Long Way from Verona (1971) 
A Few Fair Days (1971) 
The Summer After the Funeral (1973)
Bridget and William (1981)
The Hollow Land (1981), received the 1983 Whitbread Children's Book Award
Horse (1982)
Kit (1983)
Kit in Boots (1986)
Swan (1987)
Through the Doll's House Door (1987)
Black Woolly Pony (1993)
Tufty Bear (1996)
The Kit Stories (1998)

Short story collections
Black Faces, White Faces (1975), David Higham Prize for Fiction (1975), Winifred Holtby Memorial Prize (1975)
The Sidmouth Letters (1980)
The Pangs of Love and Other Stories (1983), Katherine Mansfield Award for 1984 
Showing the Flag and Other Stories (1989)
Trio: Three Stories from Cheltenham (1993)
Going into a Dark House (1994), PEN/Macmillan Silver Pen Award for 1995
Missing the Midnight (1997)
The Green Man (1998)
The People on Privilege Hill (2007), nominated for the  National Short Story Prize
The Stories of Jane Gardam (2014)

Novels
Bilgewater (1977)
God on the Rocks (1978); *Prix Baudelaire (France) (1989): nominated for The Booker Prize Best Novel (1978)
Crusoe's Daughter (1985)
The Queen of the Tambourine (1991); Whitbread Novel Award (1991)
Faith Fox (1996) 
The Flight of the Maidens (2000)
Old Filth (2004)
The Man in the Wooden Hat (2009)
 Last Friends (2013), shortlisted for the 2014 Folio Prize

Non-fiction
The Iron Coast (1994)

References

External links

 
 Jane Gardam at British Council: Literature: Writers
 Interview, The Guardian, 29 July 2005 (retrieved 12/23/11)
 Interview, The Guardian, 7 January 2011 (retrieved 12/21/11)
 Costa Book Awards (formerly Whitbread Book Awards)

1928 births
Living people
Alumni of Bedford College, London
English short story writers
English women novelists
English children's writers
Costa Book Award winners
Fellows of the Royal Society of Literature
Officers of the Order of the British Empire
British women short story writers
20th-century English novelists
20th-century English women writers
21st-century English novelists
21st-century English women writers
British women children's writers
People from Redcar and Cleveland
20th-century British short story writers
21st-century British short story writers